Albert Henry Wratislaw (5 November 1822 – 3 November 1892) was an English clergyman and Slavonic scholar of Czech descent.

Early life
Albert Henry Wratislaw was born 5 November 1822 in Rugby, the eldest son of William Ferdinand Wratislaw (1788–1853), a solicitor of Rugby by his wife, Charlotte Anne (d. 1863), and grandson of Marc (Maximillian, 1735–1796), styled "Count" Wratislaw von Mitrovitz, who emigrated to Rugby ca. 1770.

Albert Henry entered Rugby School, aged seven, on 5 November 1829 (Register, i. 161), and matriculated at Cambridge from Trinity College in 1840, but migrated to Christ's, where he was admitted 28 April 1842; he graduated B.A. as third classic and twenty-fifth senior optime in 1844. He was appointed fellow of Christ's College (1844–1852) and became a tutor, ordained as a priest of the Church of England in 1846, and commenced M.A. in 1847. As a result, in collaboration with Dr Charles Anthony Swainson of the college, he published Loci Communes: Common Places (1848). He left Christ's in 1852, and on 28 December 1853, married Frances Gertrude Helm (1831–1868).

He was elected a member of the Cambridge Camden Society on 8th November 1841.

During the long vacation of 1849 he visited Bohemia, studied the Czech language in Prague, and in the same autumn published at London Lyra Czecho Slovanska, or Bohemian poems, ancient and modern, translated from the original Slavonic, with an introductory essay, which he dedicated to Count Valerian Krasinski, as "from a descendant of a kindred race".

Headmaster positions
In August 1850 Wratislaw was appointed headmaster of Felsted School, his being the last appointment made by the representatives of the founder, Richard Rich, 1st Baron Rich. During the previous 24 years under Thomas Surridge, the school had greatly declined in numbers. Wratislaw commenced with 22 boys, and the revival of the school was inaugurated by him. Unfortunately he found the climate of Felsted too bleak for him, and in 1855 he migrated, with a number of his Felsted pupils, to Bury St Edmunds, to become headmaster of King Edward VI School there. At Bury also he greatly raised the numbers of the school, which controversy about the book Jashar of his predecessor, Dr John William Donaldson, is said to have helped to empty.

During the twenty years that followed his appointment at Felsted scholastic work took up nearly all Wratislaw's time.

He was one of the dozen who attended the historic December 1869 meeting of headmasters gathered by Edward Thring of Uppingham School, considered to be the very first Headmasters' Conference. In 1879 he resigned his headmastership at Bury St Edmunds, and became vicar (or rector) of the college living of Manorbier in Pembrokeshire.

Writing
After his early publication of translated poetry in 1849, he published several texts and school books, but found it difficult to keep up his Bohemian studies.

Wratislaw published The Queen's Court Manuscript, with other ancient Bohemian Poems in 1852, a translation from the original Slavonic into English verse, mostly in ballad meter. Wratislaw was aware that regarding the Queen's Court Manuscript (Rukopis královédvorský) allegedly discovered by Václav Hanka, there were rising suspicions regarding its authenticity. But he dismissed the doubt, because sceptics had not laid out concrete arguments from rational grounds. Later developments branded the manuscript as a forgery, so that Professor Morfill, while  the excellence of Wratislav's 1849 and 1852 translations, had to make a regretful remark on the inclusion of  forged poetry.

He later published Adventures of Baron Wenceslas Wratislaw of Mitrowitz (1862), which was a translation of a 1599 account by the then-young Count  (1576–1635), from whom the 
Wratislaw family claim descent. This was literally translated from the Bohemian work first published from the original manuscript by Pelzel in 1777, and prefaced by a brief sketch of Bohemian history.

It was followed in 1871 by a version from the Slavonic of the Diary of an Embassy from King George of Bohemia to King Louis XI of France. Two years later, as the result of much labour, Wratislaw produced the Life, Legend, and Canonization of St. John Nepomucen, Patron Saint and Protector of the Order of the Jesuits, being a most damaging investigation of the myth contrived by the Jesuits in 1729. Among the small group of scholars in England taking an interest in Slavonic literature, Wratislaw's reputation was now established, and in April 1877 he was called upon to deliver four lectures upon his subject at the Taylor Institution in Oxford, under the Ilchester foundation. These were published at London next year as The Native Literature of Bohemia in the Fourteenth Century.

His last work was Sixty Folk-Tales from exclusively Slavonic sources (London, 1889), a selection translated from Karel Jaromír Erben's Sto prostonárodních pohádek a pověstí slovanských v nářečích původních ("One Hundred Slavic Folk Tales and Legends in Original Dialects", 1865), also known as Čitanka  slovanská s vysvětlením slov ("a Slavic Reader with Vocabulary"). It was given a mixed review by Alfred Nutt, who said the quality of the translations cannot be reproached with auspices given by Prof. Morfill, but the work did not rise above a "charming" anthology of tales due to its shortage of critical material. Wratislaw included creation myth stories from Carniola involving the supernatural being called Kurent; Wratislaw defended this as being genuine ancient tradition, which Nutt disputed.

Later life
He gave up his benefice (college living), owing mainly to failing sight, in 1889, and retired to Southsea. He died there at Graythwaite, Alhambra Road, on 3 November 1892, aged 69.

Family
One of his sons, Albert Charles Wratislaw (1863-1938) joined the British consular service as a Student Interpreter in the Levant in 1883, and retired in 1919 after serving in various posts in the Middle East.

Explanatory notes

References
Citations

Bibliography

External links

1822 births
1892 deaths
Translators to English
19th-century translators
Fellows of Christ's College, Cambridge
19th-century English Anglican priests
People educated at Rugby School
Alumni of Christ's College, Cambridge